The men's super heavyweight (+91 kg/200.2 lbs) Low-Kick division at the W.A.K.O. European Championships 2004 in Budva was the heaviest of the male Low-Kick tournaments and involved five fighters.  Each of the matches was three rounds of two minutes each and were fought under Low-Kick kickboxing rules.

Due to there not being enough men for a tournament fit for eight, three of the fighters received a bye into the semi finals.  The tournament was won by future K-1 regional champion Łukasz Jarosz from Poland who defeated Daniele Petroni from Italy in the final by unanimous decision.  Defeated semi finalists Dragan Jovanović from Serbia and Montenegro and Ruslan Bisaev from Russia had to make do with bronze medals.

Results

Key

See also
List of WAKO Amateur European Championships
List of WAKO Amateur World Championships
List of male kickboxers

References

External links
 WAKO World Association of Kickboxing Organizations Official Site

W.A.K.O. European Championships 2004 (Budva)